Tuniu Corporation is a Chinese online travel agency. Products and services include packaged tours, accommodation reservation, airline and railway ticketing, car rentals, and corporate travel. The company listed on the Nasdaq Stock Exchange on May 9, 2014. The company headquarters are located in Nanjing with offices in Shanghai and Beijing.

History
Founded in 2006 in Nanjing by current CEO Donald Dunde Yu and current COO Alex Haifeng Yan, the company was fully incorporated on June 1, 2008.

On May 9, 2014, Tuniu was listed on the Nasdaq Stock Exchange under TOUR, co-managed by Morgan Stanley & Co, Credit Suisse Securities LLC and China Renaissance Securities. Tuniu raised $72 million in its initial public offering, pricing 8 million shares at $9 per share. CEO Donald Dunde Yu rang the opening bell at the Nasdaq MarketSite in Times Square.

In April 2015, Tuniu was the subject of a boycott by seventeen Chinese travel agencies over a pricing dispute. The issue was settled a few days later following an investigation by the China National Tourism Administration, with partner relations returning to normal. Tuniu's share price fell 4.7% following news of the dispute.

On August 23, 2016, Tuniu’s Board of Directors authorized a share repurchase program to repurchase up to $150 million worth of shares. Tuniu’s share price had fallen below opening price.

Investments and acquisitions
On July 1, 2014, Ctrip CEO James Jianzhang Liang was appointed to Tuniu’s Board of Directors.

On December 10, 2014, Tuniu and Ctrip signed a strategic collaboration agreement to share travel resources.

On December 15, 2014, Tuniu announced $148 million investment in aggregate from a group that included the investment arms of Hony Capital, JD.com, Ctrip Investment Holding Ltd, and the personal holding companies of Tuniu’s CEO and COO. Ctrip acquired $15 million Tuniu shares during their IPO, and currently owns over 3% of Tuniu’s outstanding shares.

In May, 2015, Tuniu announced the investment of $500 million from a group of investors led by JD.com. JD.com became the largest shareholder in Tuniu with 27.5% stake.

On March 9, 2015, Tuniu announced the acquisition of majority stakes in two Chinese travel agencies, Hangzhou-based Zhejiang Zhongshan International Services and Tianjin-based China Classical Holiday.

On January 21, 2016, Tuniu announced the completion of a US$500 million investment from HNA Tourism Group. Transaction purchase price was US$5.50 per Class A ordinary share. HNA Tourism Group bought 24.1% share of Tuniu.

Brand ambassadors
In July 2016, Tuniu announced the signing of Taiwanese pop stars Jay Chou and Jimmy Lin as its celebrity brand ambassadors.

References

External links
Official Website

Chinese companies established in 2006
Online travel agencies
Online retailers of China
Companies based in Nanjing
E-commerce